The European Soundmix Show 1998 was the third European Soundmix Show.

Like the previous contests, this one was held in Amsterdam, and the winner was Portugal with Carlos Bruno imitating Michael Stipe (R.E.M.).

Results

Scoreboard

5 points 
Below is a summary of all 5 points in the final:

European Soundmix Show
1998 in music
1998 in the Netherlands